Pagan Min (21 June 1811 – 14 March 1880), was the ninth king of the Konbaung dynasty of Burma. Born Maung Biddhu Khyit, he was granted the title of Prince of Pagan by his father Tharrawaddy in August 1842. Pagan Min became king when Tharrawaddy died on 17 November 1846, with the formal title of His Majesty "Sri Pawara Vijaya Nanda Jatha Maha Dharma Rajadhiraja Pagan Min Taya-gyi".

Pagan Min won the power struggle to succeed his father by having his rival brothers killed. His chief ministers Maung Baing Zat and Maung Bhein enriched themselves by executing rich subjects.

The Second Anglo-Burmese War broke out during the reign of Pagan Min. In 1851 the governor of Pegu, Maung Ok, charged the captains of two British merchant ships with murder, embezzlement, and evasion of custom duties. He fined them 500 rupees, and required their debts be paid before being authorized to return to Kolkata. After receiving their complaints, Lord Dalhousie, the governor-general of British India, sent Commodore George Lambert to the king requesting a compensation of £920 and the dismissal of Maung Ok. Pagan complied by replacing Maung Ok. But on 6 January 1852, when the new governor declined to meet with a British delegation because Lambert had seized the Burmese Royal ship,  all British subjects were evacuated and the coast of Rangoon was blockaded. Within days, British warships were bombarding Rangoon now, Yangon. On 7 February, Pagan wrote Dalhousie to protest against the acts of aggression. On 13 February, Dalhousie sent an ultimatum to the king, demanding an equivalent of £100,000 as compensation for "having had to prepare for war", to be paid by 1 April. The ultimatum expired with no reply, and a few days later, British troops invaded the Burmese territory. Britain annexed the province of Pegu in December.

Pagan Min's half brother Mindon opposed the war; he fled with his brother Kanaung to Shwebo and raised the standard of rebellion. After a few weeks of fighting, Pagan's chief minister Magwe Mingyi went over to Mindon's side and Pagan Min abdicated on 18 February 1853, in favour of Mindon. Mindon allowed Pagan to live, and released all the European prisoners. Mindon sued for peace with the British but refused to sign a treaty ceding Burmese territory.

References

Bibliography
 

 

1811 births
1880 deaths
People from Mandalay Region
Konbaung dynasty
Monarchs who abdicated
People of the Second Anglo-Burmese War
History of Myanmar
19th-century Burmese monarchs